The 2018 Bauer Watertechnology Cup was a professional tennis tournament played on carpet courts. It was the 22nd edition of the tournament which was part of the 2018 ATP Challenger Tour. It took place in Eckental, Germany between 29 October and 4 November 2018.

Singles main-draw entrants

Seeds

 1 Rankings are as of 22 October 2018.

Other entrants
The following players received wildcards into the singles main draw:
  Kevin Krawietz
  Daniel Masur
  Rudolf Molleker
  Louis Wessels

The following player received entry into the singles main draw as an alternate:
  Alexey Vatutin

The following players received entry from the qualifying draw:
  Roberto Marcora
  Albano Olivetti
  Gleb Sakharov
  Igor Sijsling

The following players received entry as lucky losers:
  Benjamin Bonzi
  Alexander Bublik
  Borna Gojo

Champions

Singles

 Antoine Hoang def.  Ruben Bemelmans 7–5, 6–3.

Doubles

 Kevin Krawietz /  Andreas Mies def.  Hugo Nys /  Jonny O'Mara 6–1, 6–4.

References

2018 ATP Challenger Tour
2018
2018 in German tennis
October 2018 sports events in Germany
November 2018 sports events in Germany